Akai Osei (born 12 April 1999) is a British actor, dancer, presenter and musician, who is best known for winning the first series of Got to Dance in February 2010 It is reported that he was inspired by Michael Jackson, Diversity, Flawless and Chris Brown. Akai joined the acting scene shortly after winning Got to Dance. He appears in the film StreetDance 3D alongside Diversity, George Sampson and Flawless, and its sequel, StreetDance 2.

Osei also appeared in Boy Blue Entertainment's street dance hip hop show Pied Piper – A Hip-Hop Dance Revolution. Osei appeared in the music video for the N-Dubz song "We Dance On" in 2010, which was the main song on the soundtrack for the film StreetDance 3D. He also appeared in an advert for Ministry of Sound Street Dance 2010 CD.

Osei has joined the cast of Into the Hoods.
Osei also appeared on Blue Peter in mid 2010. Osei also featured in annual dance show "Streets Ahead" in London 2010, which featured many dance crews and schools, including Peridot. He is featured in the song by Wretch 32, Unorthodox, featuring Example. He is seen dancing on a rooftop.

In July 2011, Akai was a judge on a talent show on Disney Channel, called Shake It Up Dance Dance. His most recent work was starring in CBBC's 4 O'Clock Club playing Josh's cousin, Nero. From Series 4 to Series 7, he stars as the show's main character as to previously being a series regular in the third series. He also made a guest appearance in Series 8

His character left in the fourth episode of Season 7, because his character was moved to America with his temporal guardian and his girlfriend but he returned as a guest appearance in Series 8 as well as appearing in the Flashbacks for Series 7 and 8 (2018–2020).

Television

Filmography

Awards and nominations 

|-
| 2011
| Honorary Award
| Young Achiever Award
| BEFFTA
| 
| 
|
|-
| 2014
| 4 O'Clock Club
| Best Children's Performer
| BAFTA
| 
| Role: Nero Johnson
|

References

1999 births
Living people
British hip hop dancers
English male rappers
Black British male rappers
English people of Ghanaian descent
People from Lambeth
Rappers from London
21st-century British dancers